The European route E45 goes between Norway and Italy, through Finland, Sweden, Denmark, Germany and Austria.

The route passes through Alta (Norway) – Kautokeino – Hetta (Finland) – Palojoensuu – Kaaresuvanto – Gällivare (Sweden) – Porjus – Jokkmokk – Arvidsjaur – Östersund – Mora – Säffle – Åmål – Brålanda – Gothenburg ... Frederikshavn (Denmark) – Aalborg – Randers – Aarhus – Skanderborg – Vejle – Kolding – Frøslev – Flensburg (Germany) – Hamburg – Hanover – Hildesheim – Göttingen – Kassel – Fulda – Würzburg – Nuremberg – Munich – Rosenheim – Wörgl (Austria) – Innsbruck – Brenner – Fortezza (Italy) – Bolzano – Trento – Verona – Modena – Bologna – Cesena – Perugia – Fiano Romano – Naples – Salerno – Sicignano – Cosenza – Villa San Giovanni ... Messina – Catania – Siracusa – Gela.

Norway and Finland 
E45 is 172 km long in Norway and 101 km long in Finland. It has no other number in Norway, but follows routes 21 and 93 in Finland.

The E45 was not signposted in Finland after the 2006 extension, since the official document uses the Swedish version ("Karesuando") of the name of the village at the Finnish–Swedish border, hinting that it would start on the Swedish side. The Swedish government proposed the extension alone in 2005 and let the E45 end at the border, partly because of lack of interest from Finnish authorities. The gap between the end of E45 and the European route E8 was about 1 km along the existing Finnish regional road 959 Karesuvanto (FIN) – Karesuando (SWE)

In August 2016, after a political proposal in 2007, the governments of Norway and Finland applied for an extension of E45 Karesuando–Kaaresuvanto–Palojoensuu–Hetta–Kautokeino–Alta. This was approved by the work group, and became valid on 5 December 2017. E45 sign posts were mounted starting 9 February 2018, replacing route 93 in Norway, and complementing road 959, 21 and 93 in Finland.

Sweden 
In November 2006, the E45 was extended with the then existing Swedish national road 45, which makes it start from Karesuando at the Swedish–Finnish border (near the E8), over Östersund–Mora–Grums, to Gothenburg and on. The signs of road 45 was changed to E45 during the summer of 2007. The E45 has now no other national number. In Sweden the road is called Inlandsvägen.

The E45 in Sweden is mostly a standard road. Between Karesuando and Torsby (1370 km) the road is usually 6–8 meters wide, and goes mostly through sparsely populated forests, with occasional villages and only two cities above 10,000 people, Östersund and Mora. The E45 is a motorway for 6 km together with the E18 south of Grums. Between Säffle and Trollhättan several parts of it is 2+1 road with a middle barrier, in total around 40 km. Between Trollhättan and Surte there is a 52 km long motorway, finished in 2012. Between Surte and Gothenburg there is a 17 km road designed equivalently to a motorway. The exception is that there are two gaps in the Trollhättan–Surte motorway and there are two traffic lights along the Surte–Gothenburg road. The speed limit is usually 100 km/h north of Mora and usually 90 km/h south thereof. There are 27 road crossings or intersections where the Swedish E45 does not follow the straight direction. There are 26 level crossings with railways. There are 19 motorway exits and 29 other motorway-like exits.

The ferry Gothenburg–Frederikshavn has about 6 daily departures and takes 3½ hours.

Denmark 
In Denmark the E45 is a motorway (speed limit ) from the south of Frederikshavn along the east coast of Jutland to the Denmark–Germany border. The E45 has no other national number. It connects to the E39 and E20 motorways.

In 1992 it was renamed from E3 (which before 1985 ended in Lisbon, Portugal) and until 2006, with the extension in Sweden, the northern endpoint was Frederikshavn.

The total length in Denmark is 357 km.

Exits in Denmark

Germany 
The E45 follows:
 A7, Danish border–Würzburg
 A3, Würzburg–Nuremberg
 A9, Nuremberg–Munich
 A99, Munich Beltway
 A8, Munich–Rosenheim
 A93, Rosenheim–Austrian border
The length in Germany is 1022 km.

Between Nuremberg and Verona, Italy the E45 corresponds with the route of the old imperial road, the Via Imperii, though the Autobahns are newer roads.

Austria 
The E45 follows:
Inn Valley Autobahn A12, German border–Innsbruck
Brenner Autobahn A13, Innsbruck–Italian border (at Brenner Pass)
The length in Austria is 109 km.

Italy 
Owing to the greater recognition of motorways and nationally or locally numbered major roads in Italy, in colloquial usage "E45" often refers to the Cesena-Orte segment, possibly further expanded to include the Ravenna-Cesena section of the SS3bis (formally part of the E55, and forming together the Strada di Grande Comunicazione Ravenna-Orte) and/or the Orte-Rome segment.

Route 

 : Alta – Kautokeino – / border

 : / border – Hetta – Palojoensuu
 : Palojoensuu – Kaaresuvanto 
 : Kaaresuvanto – / border

 : Karesuando – Svappavaara (Start of Concurrency with ) – Gällivare (End of Concurrency with ) – Arvidsjaur – Storuman (Start of Concurrency with ) – Stensele (End of Concurrency with ) – Håxås – Östersund (Start of Concurrency with ) – Brunflo (End of Concurrency with ) – Sveg – Mora – Malung (Start of Concurrency with ) – Stöllet – Önneby – Torsby (End of Concurrency with ) – Vålberg – Åmål – Trollhättan – Gothenburg
  Gothenburg  – Fredrikshavn 

 
 : Fredrikshavn – Aalborg – Randers – Aarhus – Horsens – Vejle – Kolding – Haderslev – Aabenraa – / border

 
 : / border – Flensburg – Neumünster – Hamburg – Hanover – Hildesheim - Göttingen – Kassel – Fulda – Würzburg
 : Würzburg – Nuremberg 
 : Nuremberg – Ingolstadt – Munich
 : Munich
 : Munich – Rosenheim
 : Rosenheim – / border

  
 : / border – Kufstein – Wörgl (Start of Concurrency with ) – Wiesing – Innsbruck (End of Concurrency with )
 : Innsbruck – Matrei am Brenner – / border

 

 : / border – Brennero – Vipiteno – Bolzano – Trento – Rovereto – Verona – Mantua – Modena (Start of Concurrency with )
 : Modena – La Stanga (End of Concurrency with )
 : La Stanga – Bologna – Cesena 
 : Cesena – San Piero in Bagno – Sansepolcro – Città di Castello - Umbertide – Perugia – Todi – Terni
 : Terni – Narni – Orte
 : Orte – Nazzano – Monterotondo – Frosinone – Caserta – Afragola – Casalnuovo di Napoli – Casoria – Naples
 : Naples – Pompeii – Salerno 
 : Salerno – Battipaglia – Cosenza – Vibo Valentia – Villa San Giovanni
  Villa San Giovanni – Messina
 : Messina – Taormina – Giarre – Catania
 : Catania
 : Catania – Mungina – Augusta
 : Augusta – Melilli – Syracuse
 : Syracuse – Noto – Rosolini
  – Rosolini – Modica – Ragusa – Comiso – Gela

References

External links 

 UN Economic Commission for Europe: Overall Map of E-road Network (2007)

45
E045
E045
E045
E045
E045
E045
E045
E045
E045
E045
E045
E045
E045
E045
E045
E045
E045
E045
E045
Roads within the Arctic Circle